Bacton Green may refer to two places in the United Kingdom:

 Bacton Green, Norfolk, England
 Bacton Green, Suffolk, England